Megachile mlanjensis is a species of bee in the family Megachilidae. It was described by Meade-Waldo in 1913.

References

Mlanjensis
Insects described in 1913